Octahydroxyanthraquinone is an organic compound with formula , formally derived from anthraquinone by replacement of 8 hydrogen atoms by hydroxyl groups. 

Esters of octahydroxyanthraquinone, where all eight hydroxyls are replaced by straight-chain 1-alkanecarboxylate groups -()n-COO-, with n between 6 and 14, are liquid crystals and have been studied for possible LCD applications.

Octahydroxyanthraquinone is active against the malaria parasite, but rufigallol (1,2,3,5,6,7-hexahydroxyanthraquinone) is 22 times more potent.

References

Hydroxyanthraquinones
3-Hydroxypropenals within hydroxyquinones